Ras Al Khaimah International Airport  (alternatively Ra's al-Khaymah) is an international airport located in the Emirate of Ras al-Khaimah, United Arab Emirates  south of Ras Al Khaimah, on the coast of the Persian Gulf. The airport has two passenger terminal buildings as well as cargo, aircraft maintenance, and aviation training facilities.

History

In 1976, the airport was inaugurated by the long-time ruler, Sheikh  Saqr bin Mohammad Al Qasimi. Unlike Dubai International Airport, Ras Al Khaimah International Airport did not develop into an international or regional aviation hub.

In 2007, RAK Airways started operating as the national airline with a hub at the airport. It suspended regular operations in 2008 due to the global economic crisis. It relaunched in 2010 with new branding and management, but suspended operations permanently in 2013.

In 2014, Air Arabia started its commercial flights to different destinations including Pakistan, Egypt, Saudi Arabia and Bangladesh following the suspension of RAK Airways. Ras-al-Khaimah has been designated as an hub for Air Arabia for a period of ten years, extendable thereafter.

The airport was the second among Arab states of the Persian Gulf to secure the ISO 9001: 2000 accreditation for quality management. Currently, Ras Al Khaimah International Airport is being refocused with efforts to attract cargo business, in particular from establishments under the Ras Al Khaimah Free Trade Zone.

Airlines and destinations
The following airlines operate regular scheduled and charter flights at Ras Al Khaimah Airport:

Accidents and incidents
 In July 1998, a Ukrainian Ilyushin Il-76 cargo plane took off from the airport and crash landed into the sea nearby. All 8 crew members on board died.

In popular culture
In 2015, Ras Al Khaimah Airport served as the set for the filming of the Hindi film Airlift starring Akshay Kumar.

References

Citations

Bibliography

External links

 Official website

1976 establishments in the United Arab Emirates
Airports in the United Arab Emirates
Economy of the Emirate of Ras Al Khaimah
Geography of the Emirate of Ras Al Khaimah
Buildings and structures in Ras Al Khaimah